The American School of Bangkok (ASB;), a member of the International Schools Association of Thailand, is an international school in the Bangkok Metropolitan Area, Thailand.  The school has two campuses, the Sukhumvit campus in the Watthana District of Bangkok and the Bangna campus in the Bang Phli District, Samut Prakan Province.

Opened in 1983, ASB offers private education and is accredited by the Western Association of Schools and Colleges (WASC), the Thai Ministry of Education, and the Thai Office for National Education Standards and Quality Assessment (ONESQA). Students from 50 nations attend the school.

Both campuses offer a pre-kindergarten through high school program. Students are educated in a US curriculum which features inquiry-based learning, project-based learning in middle school, and advanced placement (AP) classes in high school. ASB is a designated AP school, and as part of its community outreach program the school orders and processes AP exams for students who attend other institutions.

ASB Green Valley is recognized for its golf team. The school team consists of a junior world champion and eight national champions. Students have the opportunity to start learning golf at the age of five years.

The school is a member of the Bangkok International Schools Athletic Conference (BISAC) as well as the Thailand International Schools Athletic Conference (TISAC), and fields teams in many sports. The ASB basketball team has won championships and tournaments (especially the varsity team). ASB also competes in sports such as baseball and football, and the baseball teams have won tournaments. ASB stresses community service and holds charitable fund-raising events including the annual Sukhumvit Fair which has raised money for causes in Thailand and abroad.

References

External links

 Office for National Education Standards and Quality Assessment

International schools in the Bangkok Metropolitan Region
International schools in Bangkok
Educational institutions established in 1983
Education in Samutprakan province
1983 establishments in Thailand
American international schools in Thailand
Buildings and structures in Samut Prakan province
Private schools in Thailand